Ellis Ferreira and Patrick Galbraith were the defending champions, but did not partner together this year.  Ferreira partnered Rick Leach, losing in the first round.  Galbraith partnered Brett Steven, losing in the first round.

Justin Gimelstob and Byron Talbot won the title, defeating Sébastien Lareau and Daniel Nestor 7–5, 6–7, 6–4 in the final.

Seeds

  Ellis Ferreira /  Rick Leach (first round)
  Patrick Galbraith /  Brett Steven (first round)
  Sébastien Lareau /  Daniel Nestor (final)
  David Macpherson /  Richey Reneberg (first round)

Draw

Draw

External links
 Draw

Nottingham Open
1998 ATP Tour